Betty Josephine Russell [″Rusty″] (1924–1985) was an outfielder who played in the All-American Girls Professional Baseball League. She was born in Globe, Arizona.

A member of a championship team, Betty Russell played for the Arizona Ramblers before joining the league with the Racine Belles during the 1946 season.

Russell saw little action with Racine, while playing as a fourth outfielder for all-stars Eleanor Dapkus, Edythe Perlick and Claire Schillace. She hit a .143 average in 12 games to help Racine clinch the 1946 championship.

Russell died in 1985 in Tonto Basin, Arizona, at the age of 60.

Three years after her death, she became part of Women in Baseball, a permanent display based at the Baseball Hall of Fame and Museum in Cooperstown, New York, which was unveiled to honor the entire All-American Girls Professional Baseball League.

Batting statistics

Sources

All-American Girls Professional Baseball League players
Baseball players from Arizona
People from Globe, Arizona
1924 births
1985 deaths
Date of death missing
20th-century American women
20th-century American people